The thirteenth floor of a building is often omitted because of superstition.

Thirteenth floor or 13th Floor may also refer to:

The Thirteenth Floor, 1999 science fiction film
The Thirteenth Floor, 2013 serial in the television series Wizards vs Aliens
The Thirteenth Floor (comic strip), British comic strip begun in 1984
13th Floor (film), 2005 Indian film starring Purab Kohli, directed by Luke Kenny
The 13th Floor, 1995 comic fantasy novel by Sid Fleischman
The 13th Floor (album), 2009 album by Sirenia
13th Floor, a 2019 album by Haviah Mighty
The 13th Floor (1988 film), 1988 horror film starring Miranda Otto
The 13th Floor, 1966 Los Angeles band, an edition of The Grass Roots
Floor 13 (video game), a computer game by Virgin Interactive, released in 1992
Floor 13 (song), a song by Machine Gun Kelly from Hotel Diablo

See also
The 13th Floor Elevators, 1960s band